The Kissinger Lecture on Foreign Policy and International Relations is an annual lecture given by an invited speaker at the Library of Congress, Washington D.C. It was established in 2001 to honor Henry Kissinger, the former United States Secretary of State, along with the annual Kissinger Scholar as holder of the Henry Alfred Kissinger Chair in Foreign Policy and International Relations that was established in 2000. 

The lectures have been given by:
  Henry Kissinger, Inaugural Lecture 2001
 Valéry Giscard d'Estaing, 2003
 George Shultz, 2004
 Fernando Henrique Cardoso, 2005
 James Baker, 2007

External links
 Library of Congress, Kissinger Lectures

Political science organizations
Henry Kissinger